The Journal of Physical Oceanography is a peer-reviewed scientific journal published by the American Meteorological Society. It was established in January 1971 and is available on the web since 1996. Online articles older than one year are available as open access. The editor-in-chief is Jerome Smith (Scripps Institution of Oceanography).

Abstracting and indexing
This journal is abstracted and indexed in:

According to the Journal Citation Reports, the journal has a 2020 impact factor of 3.373.

References

External links 
 

Oceanography journals
Publications established in 1971
Monthly journals
English-language journals
Delayed open access journals
American Meteorological Society academic journals